Myro may refer to:

People
 Moero or Myro, a Greek female poet from Byzantium
 Myro of Rhodes, a Greek female philosopher

Other
 Myro (spider), a genus of spider within the family Toxopidae

See also

 Myron (disambiguation)